The Taifa of Arcos was a Berber medieval taifa kingdom that existed in two periods; first from 1011 to 1068. Ruled by the Zanata Berber family of the Banū Jizrūn. From 1068 until 1091 it was under the forcible control of Seville, by Abbad II al-Mu'tadid. It regained its independence from 1143 to 1145 when it was finally conquered by the Almohad Caliphate.

The Banū Jizrūn, belonging to the Berber Zanata confederation, led by Muhammad I, seized the cora of Sidonia after expelling the Umayyad governor that ruled. The dynasty proclaimed its independence, giving rise to the kingdom Taifa of Arcos in 1011, with its capital in the present city of Arcos de la Frontera.

List of Emirs

Jizrunid dynasty

Muhammad I al-Jazari Imad ad-Dawla: 1011/2–1029/30
'Abdun ibn Muhammad: 1029/30–1053
Muhammad II al-Qaim: 1053–1068/9

Conquest
To Seville: 1068/9–1091
To the Almoravids: 1101–1143

Idrisid dynasty
Abu'l-Qasim Ahyal (also in Jerez): 1143–1145
To the Almohads: 1145–1248

See also
 List of Sunni Muslim dynasties

References

Arcos
Berber dynasties
History of Andalusia
12th century in Al-Andalus
States and territories established in 1011
1011 establishments in Europe
States and territories disestablished in 1145
1145 disestablishments in Europe
11th-century establishments in Al-Andalus
12th-century disestablishments in Al-Andalus